Hippodamia is a genus of ladybirds in the family Coccinellidae. It includes the most common native North American "ladybug", H. convergens, which can form overwintering aggregations numbering in the millions. Another notable member is Hippodamia variegata, which occurs widely over both the North and South Hemispheres.

Members of the genus tend to share an elongated body form with red or orange elytra, and a black and white pronotum. Many species, particularly in North America, are highly variable to the extent that they cannot be separated without dissection in many cases.

Species

 Hippodamia americana Crotch, 1873 - American Lady Beetle 
 Hippodamia apicalis Casey, 1899 
 Hippodamia arctica (Schneider, 1792) 
 Hippodamia caseyi Johnson, 1910 - Casey's Lady Beetle 
 Hippodamia convergens Guérin-Méneville, 1842 - Convergent Lady Beetle 
 Hippodamia expurgata Casey, 1908 
 Hippodamia falcigera Crotch, 1873 
 Hippodamia glacialis (Fabricius, 1775) - Glacial Lady Beetle 
 Hippodamia koebelei Timberlake, 1942 
 Hippodamia lunatomaculata Motschulsky, 1845 
 Hippodamia moesta LeConte, 1854 - Sorrowful Lady Beetle
 Hippodamia notata (Laicharting, 1781) 
 Hippodamia oregonensis Crotch, 1873 
 Hippodamia parenthesis (Say, 1824) - Parenthesis Lady Beetle 
 Hippodamia quindecimmaculata Mulsant, 1850 - Barred Lady Beetle 
 Hippodamia quinquesignata (Kirby, 1837) - Five-spotted Lady Beetle 
 Hippodamia septemmaculata (DeGeer, 1775) 
 Hippodamia sinuata Mulsant, 1850 
 Hippodamia tredecimpunctata (Linnaeus, 1758) - Thirteen-spotted Lady Beetle 
 Hippodamia variegata (Goeze, 1777)
 Hippodamia washingtoni Timberlake, 1939 - Washington's Lady Beetle

References

 Lady beetles: A Checklist of the Coccinellidae of Vermont (Insecta: Coleoptera)

External links

 Hippodamia at BugGuide

Coccinellidae genera
Taxa named by Pierre François Marie Auguste Dejean
Coccinellidae